Semisalsa stagnorum is a species of small brackish water snail with a gill and an operculum,  an aquatic gastropod mollusk in the family Cochliopidae.

Distribution
This species occurs in the Mediterranean Sea, the Baltic Sea, the North Sea and the North Atlantic Ocean.

References

 Bouchet, P. 1996.  Hydrobia scamandri.   
 2006 IUCN Red List of Threatened Species.   Downloaded on 7 August 2007.
 Howson, C.M.; Picton, B.E. (Ed.) (1997). The species directory of the marine fauna and flora of the British Isles and surrounding seas. Ulster Museum Publication, 276. The Ulster Museum: Belfast, UK. . vi, 508

Cochliopidae
Molluscs of the Atlantic Ocean
Marine molluscs of Europe
Molluscs of the Mediterranean Sea
Fauna of the Baltic Sea
Fauna of the North Sea
Vulnerable animals
Vulnerable biota of Europe
Gastropods described in 1791
Taxa named by Johann Friedrich Gmelin
Taxonomy articles created by Polbot